Hato Rey Central is one of the 18 barrios of the municipality of San Juan, Puerto Rico. With a population density of 16,155.3 per square mile. It has a land area of 1.03 sq mi and a 2010 Census population of 16,640.

Hato Rey Central was a barrio of the former municipality of Rio Piedras, before it was merged with San Juan in 1951.

It is bounded by Hato Rey Norte to the west, by barrio Universidad to the south, by Oriente to the east, and by Santurce to the north. The Caño Martín Peña separates Hato Rey Central from Santurce.

Demographics

The population of the barrio is of 16,640, with a population density of 16,155 residents per square mile.

Districts
The barrio of Hato Rey Central is further divided into 4 subbarrios, from north to south:  
Las Monjas
Ciudad Nueva
Floral Park
Quintana

Landmarks and places of interest 

 Martín Peña Bridge (shared with Hato Rey Norte), Art Deco-style bridge that connects Hato Rey Central with Santurce.
 Milla de Oro, the central business district of San Juan.
 Polytechnic University of Puerto Rico's main campus.

Transportation 
Although none of the Tren Urbano stations are technically located in Hato Rey Central, the Piñero, Domenech, Roosevelt and Hato Rey metro stations are located very close (in some cases even steps away) to the barrio. The area is also served by the Metropolitan Bus Authority (AMA).

Gallery

See also

Hato Rey
 List of communities in Puerto Rico

References

Río Piedras, Puerto Rico
Barrios of San Juan, Puerto Rico